Heather Hardy (born January 25, 1982) is an American professional boxer and mixed martial artist. In boxing, she held the WBO featherweight title from 2018 to 2019. She is also a trainer, living and working in Brooklyn, New York. As of September 2020, she is ranked as the world's third best active female featherweight by BoxRec and fourth by The Ring.

Early life and family 
Heather Hardy was born on January 25, 1982, to John and Linda Hardy and is of Irish descent. She has two younger siblings, Kaitlyn and Colin. Hardy had married her highschool sweetheart in 2004, but after some hard times the pair divorced in 2010. Hardy was raised in Gerritsen Beach in South Brooklyn.

While in school, Hardy was active in athletics, aspiring to become the first female pitcher for the New York Yankees. Hardy went on to major in Forensic Psychology at John Jay College of Criminal Justice in Manhattan. She graduated at the age of 22.

Boxing career
Heather started boxing in 2010 when she was going through a rough patch in her life: she was working a series of miscellaneous jobs to support her daughter, sister, and nephew and finalizing a divorce with her husband who would not pay child support. Within three weeks of training, Hardy, a 28 year old rookie, had her first fight in front of an average sized audience in Long Island, and won. Even though her first fight was just meant for fun, it helped her find out that boxing was her calling.
 Regarding her first time in the ring, Hardy said  "I'm shy by nature, so walking to the ring was like heading to the gas chamber. I'm probably exaggerating the crowd size, but it felt like I was in the Macy's Parade. When I got to my corner, a cousin told me to pretend a tiger was dropped in the ring and only one of us was getting out alive. I pummeled that girl so bad. And for the first time in my life, I felt like something was all mine. Ever since, I've had the passion to beat up the world. I still fight that way". Shortly after, she quickly began winning other kickboxing and Muay Thai titles. Her determination and passion were soon noticed when she caught the eye of a professional trainer who offered to let her train at Gleason's Gym. Hardy began to grow in popularity on the boxing scene and soon became known for her tenacity and determination in and out of the ring. In regards to what others thought about her fame, she mockingly said "'Yeah right, who's this little blonde white girl with the braids?' They knew me quick because I started tearin' ass". Despite her newfound popularity, Hardy remains humble; she can still be found selling tickets before her fights and training clients at Gleason's.  In 2016, Hardy made major strides for women's boxing by landing a televised gig on NBCSN against Shelly Vincent.

Mixed martial arts career

Invicta Fighting Championship 
Hardy was scheduled to make her professional MMA debut against Brieta Carpenter at Invicta FC 21. However, the bout was cancelled due to an injury by Carpenter.

Bellator MMA 
Hardy made her professional MMA debut at Bellator 180 in a flyweight bout against Alice Yauger on June 24, 2017, at the Madison Square Garden. She won the fight via TKO in the third round.

Hardy faced Kristina Williams in a flyweight contest at Bellator 185. She lost the bout via TKO due to a doctor stoppage in the second round after a head kick from Williams shattered her nose.

Hardy faced Ana Julaton on February 16, 2018, at Bellator 194. She won the fight via unanimous decision.

Hardy faced Taylor Turner at Bellator 222 on June 14, 2019. She lost the fight via first round TKO.

On July 10, 2021, it was announced that she was no longer under contract with Bellator.

In the media 
Following her rise to fame, Hardy has been a persistent voice for women's boxing. In 2013, shortly after women's boxing was declared as a featured sport in the 2012 London Olympics, an independent film director named Natasha Verma tackled the subject of the gender wage gap in boxing through her film "Hardy". She interviewed Hardy on her experiences and talked about how she was changing the face of a generally male dominated sport.

In 2016, Hardy partnered with Dove on their #MyBeautyMySay campaign.

Professional boxing record

Mixed martial arts record

|-
|Loss
|align=center|2–2
|Taylor Turner		
|TKO (punches)
|Bellator 222
|
|align=center| 1
|align=center| 3:53
|New York City, New York, United States
|
|-
| Win
| align=center| 2–1
| Ana Julaton
| Decision (unanimous)
| Bellator 194
| 
| align=center|3
| align=center|5:00
| Uncasville, Connecticut, United States 
|
|-
| Loss
| align=center| 1–1
| Kristina Williams
| TKO (doctor stoppage)
| Bellator 185
| 
| align=center|2
| align=center|2:00
| Uncasville, Connecticut, United States 
|
|-
| Win
| align=center| 1–0
| Alice Yauger
| TKO (punches)
| Bellator 180
| 
| align=center|3
| align=center|4:47
| New York City, New York, United States 
|
|-
|}

References

Living people
1982 births
Sportspeople from Brooklyn
American female mixed martial artists
World boxing champions
American women boxers
Flyweight mixed martial artists
Mixed martial artists utilizing boxing
Boxers from New York City
Featherweight boxers
Super-bantamweight boxers
Mixed martial artists from New York (state)
American people of Irish descent
21st-century American women